Jenny Anne Barretto is a Filipino geologist and geophysicist based in New Zealand. She is credited for the discovery of Apolaki, the largest caldera in the world.

Barretto was born and raised in the Philippines. She acquired her master's degree in Geology from the University of the Philippines in 1998.

Career and research
Barretto initially worked at UP National Institute of Geological Sciences in Quezon City. She took part at the initial examination of the structure of Benham Rise; it was a prerequisite for the Philippine government's formal claim of the territory in 2012. They were able to prove the morphological affinity of Benham Rise to the country's largest island, Luzon, and therefore concluded that Benham Rise is an extension of the Philippines' continental platform. Barreto conducted several 
morphological and geological research within the expanse of the Philippines.

Barretto began working as a geologist and geophysicist for GNS Science in 2013.

Barretto led an in-depth research project on Benham Rise in 2015. Her team included Ray Wood from GNS Science and John Milsom from Gladestry Associates. In October 2019, they published the extensive research paper about its morphology and structure, and it featured the Apolaki Caldera, which Barretto named herself. The team made use of the data garnered from the initial study of the region.

Barretto is also a member of American Association of Petroleum Geologists and the Geological Society of the Philippines.

References

Women geologists
New Zealand women scientists
Living people
University of the Philippines alumni
Women geophysicists
Year of birth missing (living people)